This is a list of 57 member states of the Organisation of Islamic Cooperation sorted by their estimated population.

Population

Muslim population
8 countries-  Benin, Cameroon, Gabon, Guyana, Mozambique, Suriname, Togo and Uganda  are not Muslim-majority, but they are members of Organisation of Islamic Cooperation.

See also
 Organisation of Islamic Cooperation
 List of largest cities in Organisation of Islamic Cooperation member countries
 Economy of the Organisation of Islamic Cooperation
 List of Organisation of Islamic Cooperation member states by GDP (PPP)
 List of Organisation of Islamic Cooperation member states by GDP per capita (PPP)
 List of Organisation of Islamic Cooperation member states by exports
 List of Organisation of Islamic Cooperation member states by imports

References

OIC
Organisation of Islamic Cooperation